Run With It is the first full-length album from Canadian musician Emma McKenna.

Track listing
"Run With It" – 2:17
"The Grass That Grows" – 2:58
"Slow The Moon" – 3:01
"Wild Dogs" – 2:50
"Gone Before" – 2:14
"Little Thing" – 1:08
"Gold For Eyes" – 2:55
"The Cliff" – 2:20
"Your Body" – 1:50
"25 Seconds" – 2:30
"Over" – 2:05
"Happiness" – 2:49

References 

2010 albums
Emma McKenna albums